Idalaka is a Malayo-Polynesian dialect chain spoken in East Timor. The name is a portmanteau of Idaté and Lakalai.

Relation to other languages 
The Idalaka dialects are closely related to Tetum and Habun, while they exhibit many similarities with Galoli. Idalaka also resembles the Kemak language in that there are archaic features such as personal prefixes in verbs, which are lost in Mambai and Tokodede.

Geographic distribution 
The dialects are spoken in the Ramelau mountains with the exception of endangered Lolein, which is spoken in Dili. The 2015 census recorded 19,913 people in East Timor as native speakers of Idalaka dialects.

Official status 
Idalaka is one of 15 recognized national languages of East Timor.

Dialects 
Idaté (Idate) is the vernacular in Laclubar (Manatuto Municipality) and the bordering area in adjacent Manufahi. It has a total of 14,178 native speakers.

Lakalei is spoken in the area of Fahinehan (Manufahi). It has a total of 3,669 native speakers.

Isní is spoken east of Turiscai (Manufahi), with a total of 1,855 native speakers.

Lolein is spoken in Talitu (Aileu Municipality), Becora Leten and Hera (Dili Municipality). Lolein developed from the Isní of 19th century immigrants from Turiscai. In Dili municipality, 568 people speak Lolein, another 533 speakers live in the adjacent Alieu Municipality. A total of 1,155 people are native in the dialect across East Timor.

Vocabulary

References

Bibliography 

 

Languages of East Timor
Timor–Babar languages